The Arkansas–Monticello Boll Weevils football program is the intercollegiate American football team for the University of Arkansas at Monticello located in the U.S. state of Arkansas. The team competes in the NCAA Division II and are members of the Great American Conference. Arkansas–Monticello's first football team was fielded in 1911. The team plays its home games at Willis "Convoy" Leslie Cotton Boll Stadium in Monticello, Arkansas. The Boll Weevils are coached by Hud Jackson.

Conference Affiliations 

 Independent (1911 - 1941, 1943 - 1944, 1946 - 1960)
 No Team (WWII) (1942, 1945)
 Arkansas Intercollegiate Conference (1961 - 1994)
 Gulf South Conference (1995 - 2010)
 Great American Conference (2011–present)

Playoff appearances

NAIA
The Boll Weevils made two appearances in the NAIA playoffs, with a combined record of 2–2.

Boll Weevils in professional football

Active
As of May 2018, there is a total of one Boll Weevil listed on team rosters in the NFL, CFL, and AFL.

Eric Crocker, DB for the Portland Thunder
Clarence Denmark, WR for the Winnipeg Blue Bombers
D. J. Stephens, WR for the San Antonio Talons
Jalen Tolliver, WR for the Tennessee Titans

Rivalries

Southern Arkansas Muleriders

References

External links
 

 
American football teams established in 1913
1913 establishments in Arkansas